The following is a list of the IRMA's number-one singles of 1999. The dates shown are Sundays.

See also
1999 in music
List of artists who reached number one in Ireland

1999 in Irish music
1999 record charts
1999